Yasimika is the first studio album by Djeli Moussa Diawara (aka Jali Musa Jawara), Guinean Kora player (Korafola), released in 1983.

Background
Djeli Moussa Diawara recorded his first LP, now known as Yasimika, in Abidjan in 1982. He was 20 years old and came to the city following his half-brother Mory Kante.
This album is still nowadays considered a great piece of African music, and many music lovers consider it changed their appreciation of traditional music, specifically the second track (Haidara), that would appear on many compilations, like The Rough Guide To The Music Of Mali & Guinea released by World Music Network in 2000.
During the 80s, Mande pop was starting to lose its folk origins and was becoming a kind of dance music, even topping the European charts.
At the same time, a kind of roots revival occurred, led by Djeli Moussa, already an accomplished acoustic singer and Kora player, with the release of this acclaimed album.

Charlie Gillett told the following story in January 2009:

Quotes
(...) the flowing grace of Jali Musa Jawara's classic "Haidara". (...)

Releases, reissues and remastering

This album was released under various names and record labels, with the artist being either referenced as Djeli Moussa Diawara or Jali Musa Jawara.

 1983 : LP - no title - A.S. Records (Côte d'Ivoire) - ref. AS016
 1983 : LP - no title - Tangent Records (UK) - ref. TAN7002
 1983 : LP - "Direct From West Africa" - Go Records (UK) - ref. GGLP1
 1986 : LP - unknown title - Oval (UK) - ref. OVLP51
 1991 : CD - "Yasimika" - Hannibal (USA) - ref HNCD1355

The original masters were sold in March 2010 to CybearSonic, a new French label.
On 10/01/2010, the fully restored and remastered version was released on digital platforms as "Yasimika (Abidjan 1982)".

Track listing

Personnel
 Djeli Moussa Diawara – vocals, Kora
 Kissiman – guitar
 Lamine Kouyate – guitar
 Kouyate Djelimoridjan – Balafon
 Djanka Diabate, Fanta Kouyate & Djenin Doumbia – chorus

References

External links
Official Djeli Moussa Diawara's Website

1983 albums